Szekeres is a Hungarian surname. Notable people with the surname include:

 Adrián Szekeres
 Béla Szekeres (disambiguation)
Cyndy Szekeres
 Dorina Szekeres
 Esther Szekeres
 Ferenc Szekeres
 George Szekeres
 Imre Szekeres
 Jozef Szekeres
 Klára Szekeres
 László Szekeres
 Nicholas Sekers (1910-1972), British industrialist, born Miklós Szekeres
 Pál Szekeres
 Tamás Szekeres
 Tom Szekeres
 Zsolt Szekeres